Pseudotorinia phorcysi is a species of sea snail, a marine gastropod mollusk in the family Architectonicidae, the staircase shells or sundials.

Description
The size of the shell attains 2.69 mm.

Distribution
This marine species occurs off South-east Brazil.

References

 Rodrigo Salvador & Daniel Cavallari (2016): Range extension of Pseudotorinia phorcysi (Gastropoda: Architectonicidae) from the SW Atlantic, with remarks on its ontogeny; Zootaxa  4175 (5): 491–493

Architectonicidae